The Battle of Cape Burnas was a naval engagement between the Soviet and Romanian navies near the Burnas Lagoon in October 1942.

On 1 October 1942, the Soviet M-class submarine M-118 attacked and sank the German transport ship Salzburg, which was carrying on board 2,000 Soviet prisoners of war. After attacking, the submarine was located by a German BV 138C flying boat, and the Romanian gunboats Sublocotenent Ghiculescu and Stihi Eugen were sent to the scene. The two Romanian warships attacked the Soviet submarine with depth-charges, sinking her with all hands.

Alternative versions 
Recent surveys in the area failed to find the wreck in the alleged sinking location and it has been raised the alternative version that M-118 was lost due to a German seaplane attack or from a Romanian field barrage "S-30".

At the same time, one literary source attests that two Soviet submarines were confirmed to have been sunk by Romanian surface units. There are several Soviet submarines claimed to have been sunk by Romanian surface warships, but the two most valid claims are M-118 and Shch-206, sunk on 9 July 1941.

References

External links 
 M-118 of the Soviet Navy
 M-118 (rus)

Cape Burnas
Cape Burnas
Cape Burnas
Cape Burnas
Military history of the Black Sea